Rut Rex-Viehöver is a German actor and musician.

Selected filmography
 The White Horse Inn (1960)
 What Is the Matter with Willi? (1970)
 Our Willi Is the Best (1971)
 The Heath Is Green (1972)
 Old Barge, Young Love (1973)
 Stolen Heaven (1974)
 Schwarzwaldfahrt aus Liebeskummer (1974)
 The Fruit is Ripe (1976) - Patricia's mother

References

External links
 

1931 births
German film actresses
People from Saarbrücken
Living people